BYH may refer to:

 Arkansas International Airport, US, IATA code
 Bhujel language, ISO 639-3 code